Stemmelkort are small, fried carrot-patties, traditionally from the Westphalia region of Germany. They consist of carrots, eggs, flour, nutmeg, stock, salt and pepper. They are fried in butter and may be served with a meal as an accompaniment, or on their own.

See also 
 Bauernfrühstück
 Bubble and squeak

External links 
 Recipe for Stemmelkort 

German cuisine